The Palacio de los Deportes Virgilio Travieso Soto is an 8,337-seat multi-purpose arena in Santo Domingo, Dominican Republic, built in 1974 for the XII Central American and Caribbean Games. It currently hosts local sporting events and concerts and held the basketball games during the 2003 Pan American Games. It is known as "La Media Naranja" (The Half Orange) for its characteristic orange roof. The arena is also used in the Miss Dominican Republic Pageant. It also hosted games from the 2010 World Youth Women's Handball Championship.

It hosted the 2005 FIBA Americas Championship.

Events and Concerts

Notes

References

Indoor arenas in the Dominican Republic
Sports venues in Santo Domingo
Basketball venues in the Dominican Republic